Anastasia Dmitrievna Gimazetdinova, married surname: Kipnis (born 5 May 1980) is an Uzbekistani former competitive figure skater. She is the 2008 Asian Trophy champion and a three-time Uzbekistani national champion. At the 2010 Winter Olympic Games, she finished in 23rd place.

Personal life 
Gimazetdinova was born 5 May 1980 in Tashkent, Uzbek SSR, Soviet Union. In June 2008, she married Eduard Kamynin, a Russian track and field athlete, whom she later divorced. In 2012, she married Gregory Kipnis. Their daughter, Anastasia, was born on 30 November 2012.

Career 
Gimazetdinova was coached by Igor Ksenofontov until his death in the summer of 1999. She then trained without a coach until the end of the 2000–01 season. In the 2001–02 season, she began working with Peter Kiprushev in Pervouralsk.

A foot injury caused Gimazetdinova to withdraw after the short program from the 2006 Four Continents. She competed at the 2006 Olympics, finishing 29th. In 2009, she received an Olympic Solidarity scholarship. She placed 23rd at her second Olympics.

Gimazetdinova last competed internationally at the 2011 Asian Winter Games. She continues to skate in shows and also works as a coach in Yekaterinburg.

Programs

Competitive highlights 
GP: Grand Prix

References

External links 

 

Uzbekistani female single skaters
Figure skaters at the 2006 Winter Olympics
Olympic figure skaters of Uzbekistan
1980 births
Living people
Sportspeople from Tashkent
Figure skaters at the 2010 Winter Olympics
People from Pervouralsk
Figure skaters at the 1999 Asian Winter Games
Figure skaters at the 2003 Asian Winter Games
Figure skaters at the 2007 Asian Winter Games
Figure skaters at the 2011 Asian Winter Games
Uzbekistani expatriates in Russia